Lakshman Das Mittal,  was Born in  August 1931 in Hoshiarpur he is  also spelled as Lachhman Das Mittal, is an Indian business  tycoon . He is the owner and  chairman of the Sonalika Group. He is  82nd richest person of  India.  with the net worth of 2.31 Billion. He has been the Chairman of Tractor Manufacturer's Association of India and member of National Council of Confederation of Indian Industry.

Early life and education
Mittal has completed his Master of Arts (English & Urdu) from Panjab University. In 1970 he began manufacturing wheat threshers with the help of local blacksmiths in Hoshiarpur, Punjab. The following year his family went bankrupt and by 1970 his net worth was Rs 1 lakh. He said, "Once I applied for dealership of Maruti Udyog but was rejected. Today, I give out dealerships."   LD Mittal has Net Worth of 2.31 Billion He is listed  #82 Richest person of India by Forbes Magazine.

Career 
Mittal started his business career in 1970  , after pre  retiring from the state-owned Life Insurance Corporation of India.Sonalika Started Manufacturing Thrashers in 1970.

He founded Sonalkia Group in 1970 and Sonalika Tractors in 1996, which is now India's third-largest tractor manufacturer by market share.

Mittal has since handed over leadership of the Sonalkia Group to his sons Amrit sagar Mittal

and Deepak Mittal, but still attends the office every day.

References

Living people
Businesspeople from Punjab, India
People from Hoshiarpur
1931 births